The siege of Nundydroog was conducted by British East India Company forces under the command of General Charles Cornwallis in October 1791, during the Third Anglo-Mysore War.  The fortress of Nundydroog, was held by the forces of Tipu Sultan, the ruler of Mysore. Tipu Sultan managed to successfully defend the fort and the British eventually retreated.

References

Marshman, John Clark (1863). The history of India

Nundydroog
Nundydroog 1791
Nundydroog 1791
Nundydroog 1791
Nundydroog 1791
1791 in India